Paul James Davis (March 21, 1925 – February 21, 1989) was an American football player who played for two seasons for the Pittsburgh Steelers of the National Football League. He played college football at Ohio State University and Otterbein University.

References

1925 births
1989 deaths
American football fullbacks
Ohio State Buckeyes football players
Otterbein Cardinals football players
Pittsburgh Steelers players
Players of American football from Kentucky
People from Ashland, Kentucky
People from Loxahatchee, Florida